Redde Northgate plc is the UK's largest commercial vehicle rental provider, with over 100,000 vehicles in the UK and Spain. It is headquartered in Darlington, County Durham. The company is listed on the London Stock Exchange and is a constituent of the FTSE 250 Index.

History

Goode Durrant plc
Goode Durrant plc was incorporated on 2 July 1897.

In January 1987, Goode Durrant & Murray Group plc was acquired by an Australia-listed company Ariadne Australia via its Hong Kong-listed company Impala Pacific, which renamed the UK company to Goode Durrant plc.

In July 1987, Goode Durrant acquired Northgate Motor Holdings, a company established by Alan Noble in 1981 as Noble Self Drive in Darlington.

In 1997, Goode Durrant bought Transport Development Group (TDG) Vehicle Rental.

Northgate plc
In 1999, Goode Durrant plc was renamed into Northgate plc. In 2002 the Company acquired 40% of Furgonetas de Alquiler SA, a Spanish vehicle rental business, and subsequently exercised an option to buy the remainder. In 2005, Arriva sold its UK-wide vehicle rental business to Northgate for £129 million.

Kevin Bradshaw replaced Bob Contreras as chief executive in 2017.

Redde Northgate plc 
In 2020, Northgate plc merged with Redde plc, a provider of incident and accident management services, to form Redde Northgate plc.

Martin Ward replaced Kevin Bradshaw as chief executive as part of the merger.

Operations
The Company offers vehicle rental, vehicle disposal, vehicle ancillary services, repairs, accident management, and vehicle data.

References

External links

Northgate vehicle hire

1981 establishments in England
Companies based in County Durham
Companies listed on the London Stock Exchange
Borough of Darlington
Car rental companies of the United Kingdom
British companies established in 1897
British companies established in 1981
Privately held companies of the United Kingdom
Transport companies established in 1981
Business services companies established in 1981